Qaraoğlan (also, Karaoglan and Madzhar-Karaoglan) is a village and municipality in the Yevlakh Rayon of Azerbaijan.  It has a population of 1,196.

References 

Populated places in Yevlakh District